The Fat Duck is a fine dining restaurant in Bray, Berkshire, England, owned by the chef Heston Blumenthal.  Housed in a 16th-century building, the Fat Duck opened on 16 August 1995.  Although it originally served food similar to a French bistro, it soon acquired a reputation for precision and invention, and has been at the forefront of many modern culinary developments, such as food pairing, flavour encapsulation and multi-sensory cooking.

The number of staff in the kitchen increased from four when the Fat Duck first opened to 42, resulting in a ratio of one kitchen staff member per customer. The Fat Duck gained its first Michelin star in 1999, its second in 2002 and its third in 2004, making it one of eight restaurants in the United Kingdom to earn three Michelin stars. It lost its three stars in 2016, as it was under renovation, preventing it from being open for assessment. It regained all three stars in the following year.

The Fat Duck is known for its fourteen-course tasting menu featuring dishes such as nitro-scrambled egg and bacon ice cream, an Alice in Wonderland-inspired mock turtle soup involving a bouillon packet made up to look like a fob watch dissolved in tea, and a dish called Sound of the Sea which includes an audio element. It has an associated laboratory where Blumenthal and his team develop new dish concepts. In 2009, the Fat Duck suffered from the largest norovirus outbreak ever documented at a restaurant, with more than 400 diners falling ill.

Description
The Fat Duck is located on the high street of Bray, Berkshire. The owner, Heston Blumenthal, has owned the premises since it opened at the location in 1995. It is not the only Michelin three-star restaurant in Bray, the other being Michel Roux's restaurant the Waterside Inn. As of 2022, it is one of eight restaurants in the United Kingdom with three Michelin stars.

The Fat Duck has fourteen tables, and can seat 42 diners. It has a high proportion of chefs working, 42, equating to one chef per diner. Much of the menu is developed by experimentation: for example, the egg and bacon ice cream came about following Blumenthal investigating the principles of "flavour encapsulation". A research laboratory where Blumenthal and his team develop dishes is two doors away opposite the Hinds Head pub, which is also owned by the chef. It was where the majority of the laboratory scenes for the television series Heston Blumenthal: In Search of Perfection were filmed. The lab equipment includes a centrifuge which is used to make chocolate wine, and a vacuum oven. The restaurant takes reservations up to two months in advance, and  it was receiving some 30,000 calls for reservations per day, although that figure also included people who could not get through and were redialling.

Menu

Blumenthal was inspired as a teenager by trips to the Michelin-starred restaurants in France and the work of Harold McGee.  McGee's work in particular led him to question traditional cooking techniques and approaches which resulted in combinations which may at first appear unusual. Blumenthal incorporates psychology and the perception of diners into his dishes, explaining, "For example, eat sardine on toast sorbet for the first time, confusion will reign as the brain will be trying to tell the palate to expect a dessert and you will therefore be tasting more sweetness than actually exists." The Fat Duck serves a fourteen-course tasting menu.

Dishes served include palate cleansers made of vodka and green tea, frozen in liquid nitrogen, a snail porridge that was described by one food critic as "infamous", and ice creams of both crab, and egg and bacon, each of which drew media attention. The mock turtle soup has an Alice in Wonderland theme, where a fob watch formed of freeze-dried beef stock covered with gold leaf is dropped into a tea cup by a waiter, who pours a beef stock "tea" poured over it that dissolves the gold and the watch. A plate of ox tongue and vegetables is served alongside it to place into the soup. Toast sandwiches are served as a side dish. It had been developed for an appearance on Heston's Feasts, and was afterwards added to the menu. Dishes are served with additional sensory inputs, such as "Sounds of the Sea", a plate of seafood served with a seafood foam on top of a "beach" of tapioca, breadcrumbs and eel. Alongside the dish, diners are given an iPod to listen to crashing waves whilst they eat. Other additional sensory components include "the smell of the Black Forest" that accompanies a kirsch ice cream.

History
The Fat Duck is located in a 16th-century cottage that was modified in the 19th and 20th centuries. Prior to the restaurant, it was a pub, the Ringers. The building was Grade II listed by English Heritage on 2 May 1989.

When the Fat Duck opened in 1995, the kitchen was staffed by Blumenthal and one other employee. It served meals in the style of a French bistro, such as lemon tarts, and steak and chips. Blumenthal later said that science had already begun to influence the cooking at this stage, as already on the menu were his triple-cooked chips, which were developed to stop the potato from going soft. The restaurant came close to going bankrupt, and Blumenthal sold his house, his car and many of his possessions to keep it open.

1999—2005: Michelin stars 
After four years, the Fat Duck was awarded its first Michelin star in the 1999 list. Blumenthal worked with Professor Peter Barham of the University of Bristol, and developed a menu of dishes through experimentation such as slow-cooked lamb which avoids shocking the fibres in the meat and causing them to seize. By 2000, techniques were being used such as cooking vegetables in mineral water after discovering that the levels of calcium in tap water causes their discolouration, and freezing cuttlefish to break down the molecules in them in order to increase their tenderness.
In 2001, the Fat Duck was awarded a second Michelin star, and was also named restaurant of the year by the Automobile Association. In 2004, the Fat Duck was awarded three Michelin stars, becoming one of three restaurants in the United Kingdom to hold that level of recognition alongside the Waterside Inn, also in Bray, and Restaurant Gordon Ramsay in London. It was the fastest that a restaurant had gone from one to three stars in the UK. In the same year, the Fat Duck was ranked second in the world behind the French Laundry by the World's 50 Best Restaurants. The restaurant also received the title of Square Meal BMW Best UK Restaurant 2004. That year, food and safety officers found "borderline" levels of listeria in the foie gras and expressed concern that "no core temperatures of the meat are taken".

In 2005, the World's 50 Best Restaurants named the Fat Duck the best restaurant in the world. At the first Front of House Awards in 2007, the restaurant won the awards for Overall Service and Front Desk of the Year. In 2008, Blumenthal published The Big Fat Duck Cookbook.

2009: Norovirus outbreak 
On 27 February 2009, Blumenthal closed the Fat Duck temporarily after a number of customers reported feeling unwell at different times. By 3 March the source of the outbreak was still unclear but sabotage had been ruled out. A spokesman for the restaurant said "All this leads us to believe that it [the health scare] has not come from the restaurant and we expect to be given the all clear."  On 6 March it was reported that 400 people had stated they had felt unwell after eating at the restaurant.

The restaurant reopened on 12 March 2009. The cause of the illness was later given by the Health Protection Agency as norovirus, which was thought to originate from oysters which had been harvested from beds contaminated with sewage. The virus was spread further after being contracted by staff members.  The restaurant was criticised for its cleaning methods and its slow response to the incident. Complaints of illness from customers totalled 529. It was the largest norovirus outbreak ever documented at a restaurant.

2012: Deaths of senior staff 
On 19 November 2012, Ivan Aranto Herrera Jorge and Carl Magnus Lindgren, two senior members of staff, were killed on Chai Wan Road, Hong Kong in a traffic accident when their taxi was hit by two buses. They died along with the taxi driver, Wong Kim-chung. A further 56 people were injured in the accident. Blumenthal had been in Hong Kong and was travelling in a separate cab at the time of the crash.

2014: Relocation to Australia 
On 31 March 2014, Blumenthal announced he would be closing the Fat Duck for renovations for six months and temporarily relocating it with its entire team to Crown Towers, Melbourne, Australia. During the six months, the restaurant was named the Fat Duck, after which it was renamed Dinner by Heston Blumenthal. This was the second restaurant with that name, Blumenthal's sixth restaurant and his first restaurant outside of Britain. This temporary closure of the Bray location made the Fat Duck ineligible for assessment for the 2016 Michelin Guide, thus losing its three-starred status. It regained the stars the following year.

Reception
Fodor's described the Fat Duck as "extraordinary" and "one of the best restaurants in the country". Frommer's gave it three stars, grading it as "exceptional".

In September 1996, Ben Rogers ate at the restaurant for The Independent before it had gained any Michelin stars or the awards it has today and while it was still using something close to its original menu. Even so, he discovered that Blumenthal was cooking foie gras in sherry in order to give it a nutty flavour, although Rogers was not sure if the nutty flavour was warranted in the dish itself. He did think that a jambonneau of duck was worth praising, describing it as "delicious", but also thought that another dish of monkfish was rubbery in texture. He described the menu itself as "awkwardly written, badly punctuated, and at points quite impenetrable". Following the first Michelin star, David Fingleton visited the restaurant for The Spectator, and said that the experience was "beyond reproach; unsullied pleasure from start to finish".

In 2001, Terry Durack reviewed the restaurant for The Independent. He was initially hesitant as he expected tricks straight away and was surprised to find a bowl of normal green olives on the table as he arrived. He didn't think much of a mustard ice cream in a red cabbage gazpacho soup, but described the restaurant as "great" and gave it a score of seventeen out of twenty. Following the third Michelin star, Jan Moir of The Daily Telegraph visited the restaurant but disliked it, saying that "while many of the flavours are politely interesting, the relentless pappy textures of mousses and foams and creams and poached meats really begins to grate". She also thought the restaurant was overpriced, calling it "The Fat Profit".

Matthew Fort reviewed the restaurant for The Guardian in 2005, he said that "there is no doubt that the Fat Duck is a great restaurant and Heston Blumenthal the most original and remarkable chef this country has ever produced". A. A. Gill for The Times recommended that people should "eat here at least once to find out what is really going on in your mouth". Also in 2005, German food critic Wolfram Siebeck visited the restaurant and complained of the delays in service and of several of the dishes, described the mustard ice cream in a red cabbage gazpacho soup as a "fart of nothingness", while chef Nico Ladenis said of the restaurant, "Someone who makes egg and bacon ice cream is hailed a genius. If you vomit and make ice cream out of it, are you a star?" Tony Naylor of The Guardian enjoyed his trip to the restaurant in 2008, and afterwards criticised those who thought that spending £323.13 on a meal for two at lunchtime was too much.

In 2005, the restaurant was ranked 1st on the list of the World's 50 Best Restaurants. After spending 11 years on the list, it has dropped down to 73rd in the top 100. It has been ranked second best on numerous occasions, first behind the French Laundry and then behind El Bulli. In 2012, it was ranked in thirteenth place. In 2010, it was named the Best UK Restaurant in the Quintessentially Awards, a scheme run by the Quintessentially Group.

In 2009, it was the only restaurant to be given a top score of ten out of ten in the Good Food Guide. The editor of the guide, Elizabeth Carter, explained the reason for the score, "It's extremely rare that a restaurant cooks perfectly on a consistent basis, but we've had so many superlative reports that we're delighted to recognise the Fat Duck as the best restaurant in Britain." It retained that top score through to the 2013 edition of the guide.

See also
 List of Michelin three starred restaurants
 Dinner by Heston Blumenthal
 The Hind's Head

References

Further reading

External links

 
 Food Scientist Rachel Edwards Stuart investigates the molecular make up of flavours for Heston Blumenthal

1995 establishments in England
Restaurants in Berkshire
Michelin Guide starred restaurants in the United Kingdom
Buildings and structures in the Royal Borough of Windsor and Maidenhead
Bray, Berkshire
Molecular gastronomy
Restaurants established in 1995
Former pubs in England